The School of Architecture at UNAM is one of the leading schools of architecture and design in Mexico. It offers undergraduate and postgraduate studies in architecture, landscape architecture, urbanism and industrial design.

History
The school is one of the follow-up institutions of the former Academia de San Carlos, the other one being the School of Arts and Design. The Academia de San Carlos offered studies in architecture since 1791, under control of the Royal and Pontifical University of Mexico. The first postgraduate studies in both architecture and urbanism were opened in 1968. In 1969 the school opened its undergraduate program in industrial design, and in 1985 the undergraduate programs in urbanism and landscape architecture and postgraduate studies in industrial design.

Staff and organization
The school is run by a dean, currently B.A. Juan Ignacio Del Cueto Ruiz-Funes. He is aided by a technical council, composed of professors and student and administrative representatives, which makes decisions regarding curriculum, school calendars and schedules, among other tasks.

The school includes the four undergraduate programs (architecture, landscape architecture, urbanism and industrial design), and the graduate, specialization and research programs (in architecture, urbanism and industrial design). In addition, the school holds its own architectural office, which develops projects both for the university and for external clients; and a cultural division that manages cultural events, exhibits, publications, lectures, etc.

The undergraduate program in architecture is organised within five branches: project; urban-environmental; technology; theory, history and research. Furthermore, the program is spread among 16 partially independent studios or workshops which offer all the mandatory courses. These studios are physically located in eight two-story buildings (except for two located in the main building). These workshops originally were conceived to perform long-standing projects and focus on experimentation of different architectural conceptions, depending on the staff that the studio had, the profile of the students was formed.

The workshops are mostly named after Mexican architects or architects who have contributed to Mexican architecture:

Luis Barragán
Max Cetto
Ehécatl 21
Juan Antonio García Gayou
Domingo García Ramos

Ramón Marcos Noriega

Hannes Meyer
Juan O'Gorman
José Revueltas
Tres
José Villagrán García

Location and facilities

The school is located in Ciudad Universitaria in Mexico City, near the School of Engineering, UNAM. A separate building houses the graduate programs and the undergraduate programs in industrial design and urbanism, two libraries specializing in industrial design and in doctorate-level research, and a cafeteria.

Degrees offered
Bachelor of Architecture
Bachelor of Industrial Design
Bachelor of Landscape Architecture
Bachelor of Urbanism
Master of Architecture
Master of Industrial Design
Master of Urbanism
Doctor of Architecture
Doctor of Urbanism
Architectural specialization in Housing
Architectural specialization in Lightweight Structures
Architectural specialization in Real estate appraisal

Noted alumni 
Antonio Attolini Lack
Alberto Arai
Augusto H. Álvarez
Juan Carlos Baumgartner
Honorato Carrasco
Gabriela Carrillo
Ignacio del Rio – on behalf of STUDIO MMX
Carlos Obregón Santacilia
Teodoro González de León
Juan O'Gorman
Carlos Lazo
Carlos Leduc Montaño
Ricardo Legorreta
Mauricio De Maria y Campos
Enrique del Moral
José de Arimatea Moyao
Mario Pani
Emmanuel Ramirez – on behalf of STUDIO MMX
Pedro Ramírez Vázquez
Diego Ricalde – on behalf of STUDIO MMX
José Revueltas
Mauricio Rocha
Mario Schjetnan
Javier Senosiain
Juan Sordo Madaleno
José Villagrán García
Javier Sánchez
Félix Sánchez Aguilar
Felipe Leal Fernández
Loreta Castro Reguera

References 
https://arquitectura.unam.mx/arquitectura.html#talleres

External links 
Official Website (Spanish)

National Autonomous University of Mexico
Architecture schools
Landscape architecture schools
Design schools